"Omphalotropis sp. nov. 2" is the name used by the IUCN for an undescribed species of minute salt marsh snail with an operculum, a terrestrial gastropod mollusk, or micromollusk, in the family Assimineidae.

This species is endemic to Madagascar. Its natural habitat is subtropical or tropical dry forests. It is threatened by habitat loss.

The species was originally named O. costulata, but this name was previously used for another species and is therefore invalid. As of 2012, the species lacks a proper binomial name.

References

Omphalotropis
Assimineidae
Molluscs of Madagascar
Undescribed gastropod species
Taxonomy articles created by Polbot